Georgie Wilson Welcome Collins (born 9 March 1985) is a Honduran professional footballer who plays as a striker.

Welcome is the only player to debut with the national side playing in the second level of Honduras.

Club career
Welcome started his career at Arsenal FC (Roatan) and was snapped up by Honduran giant F.C. Motagua in 2008.

On 1 August 2010, Welcome travelled to Glasgow to begin a week-long unsuccessful trial with Scottish champions Rangers.

In January 2011, Welcome was sent to AS Monaco on loan from Motagua.

After an unsuccessful stint in Monaco, Welcome was signed by Mexican league club Atlas to a one-year contract. The transfer was announced on 20 June 2011. He then returned to Honduras, where he signed for Marathon ahead of the 2012 Clausura.

In December 2013, Platense confirmed Welcome would join them as their new striker.

In June 2015, Welcome signed with I-League side Mohun Bagan.

International career
A tall, lanky striker, Welcome was part of the Honduran U-23 team that qualified for the 2008 Olympic Games. Because of his goal in the 108th minute of the match, Honduras became CONCACAF Pre-Olympic champions after beating the host country, the United States, 1–0.

He made his debut for the full national side on 22 May 2008 in a friendly against Belize where he scored one of the two goals to win. Welcome scored a magnificent goal for the Honduras national football team in a friendly match against Latvia, a goal that turned out to be the game-winner for the Catrachos.

As of February 2013, he has earned a total of 31 caps, scoring 4 goals. He has represented his country in 4 FIFA World Cup qualification matches and played at the 2011 and 2013 Copa Centroamericana as well as at the 2009 CONCACAF Gold Cup but most prominently, in Honduras' all three games at the 2010 FIFA World Cup.

International goals
Scores and results list Honduras' goal tally first.

Honours
Arsenal
2006–07 Clausura (2nd level)

Honduras
2008 CONCACAF U-23

References

External links

1985 births
Living people
People from Roatán
Association football forwards
Honduran footballers
Honduran expatriate footballers
Honduras international footballers
2009 CONCACAF Gold Cup players
2010 FIFA World Cup players
2011 Copa Centroamericana players
2013 Copa Centroamericana players
F.C. Motagua players
AS Monaco FC players
Atlas F.C. footballers
Georgie Welcome
Ligue 1 players
Liga MX players
Liga Nacional de Fútbol Profesional de Honduras players
Premier League of Belize players
Expatriate footballers in Monaco
Expatriate footballers in Mexico
Expatriate footballers in Thailand
Expatriate footballers in Belize
Copa Centroamericana-winning players
Honduran expatriate sportspeople in Monaco
Belmopan Bandits players
Calcutta Football League players